Srećko Bogdan (born 5 January 1957) is a Croatian former professional footballer who played a defender. He is now a youth coach in NK Inter Zaprešić.

Club career
Bogdan was born in Mursko Središće, Croatia, FPR Yugoslavia. He started his career in his home town with NK Rudar Mursko Središće, where he spent three years before moving to MTČ Čakovec and starting his senior career in 1973. He spent one season and a half with Čakovec before transferring first to Dinamo Zagreb and later to Karlsruhe. He is currently in third place in Dinamo Zagreb's all-time list of appearances for the club, with a total of 595 appearances in which he scored 125 goals. He played for Dinamo Zagreb between January 1975 and June 1985, after which he moved to Karlsruhe in the German 2. Bundesliga. After two years at Karlsruhe, he managed promotion to the Bundesliga with the club and subsequently made 169 appearances for the club in the league over the following six seasons, scoring nine goals. He retired from playing in June 1993.

International career
In his international career, Bogdan played for both former Yugoslavia and Croatia, and won 11 caps for Yugoslavia and two for Croatia, scoring one goal for the latter. He made his debut for Yugoslavia in a January 1977 friendly match away against Colombia, coming on as a 30th-minute substitute for Franjo Vladić. The games for Croatia in 1990 and 1991 were unofficial, since the country was still officially part of Yugoslavia.

Managerial career
Bogdan worked as a coach at Karlsruhe's youth academy between 1993 and 1996, following his retirement as a player at the club. He went on to work as an assistant coach at the club's first team between 1996 and 2001.

The first club where he was appointed head coach was Croatian side Inter Zaprešić, where he was in charge in 2005 and 2006. He was then appointed head coach at Segesta Sisak in January 2007, staying with the club until October 2008. In October 2009, he was appointed head coach at Međimurje, signing a contract until the end of the 2009–10 season. He was sacked on 2 April 2010, when the club found themselves on the brink of the relegation zone after a streak of five games without a win. He later managed Savski Marof and became academy boss at Inter Zaprešić.

Other work
During the 2006 FIFA World Cup, Bogdan commented several of the tournament's matches as a co-commentator for the Croatian Radiotelevision (HRT).

References

External links
 
 Srećko Bogdan at the Serbia national football team website 

1957 births
Living people
People from Mursko Središće
Association football defenders
Yugoslav footballers
Yugoslavia international footballers
Croatian footballers
Croatia international footballers
Dual internationalists (football)
Mediterranean Games gold medalists for Yugoslavia
Competitors at the 1979 Mediterranean Games
Mediterranean Games medalists in football
GNK Dinamo Zagreb players
Karlsruher SC players
Yugoslav First League players
Bundesliga players
2. Bundesliga players
Yugoslav expatriate footballers
Croatian expatriate footballers
Expatriate footballers in West Germany
Yugoslav expatriate sportspeople in West Germany
Expatriate footballers in Germany
Yugoslav expatriate sportspeople in Germany
Croatian expatriate sportspeople in Germany
Croatian football managers
VfR Mannheim managers
NK Inter Zaprešić managers
HNK Segesta managers
NK Međimurje managers
Croatian expatriate football managers
Expatriate football managers in Germany